Cyclophora acritophyrta is a moth in the family Geometridae. It is found on Luzon.

References

Moths described in 1930
Cyclophora (moth)
Moths of Asia